Moonbathers is the fifth studio album by the Dutch symphonic metal band Delain. It was released on 26 August 2016 worldwide.

It features one guest appearance from Alissa White-Gluz. Just like We Are the Others, this album does not feature Marko Hietala. It is the only studio album with Ruben Israel on drums and Merel Bechtold on rhythm guitar.

Background
According to lead singer Charlotte Wessels, the lyrics on the album have a theme of death. This was unintentional and she only realized this after reviewing the lyrics she had written. Wessels has said that the title of the album comes from the idea that "Even in a dark place, there can also be that comfort in the dark." The songs "Danse Macabre" and "Chrysalis (The Last Breath)" were inspired by a film script, however she didn't specify which one.

"Scandal" is a Queen cover.
 "Turn the Lights Out" was inspired by DC comic series "The Sandman" by Neil Gaiman.
 "Hands of Gold" contains fragments of "The Ballad of Reading Gaol" by Oscar Wilde.
 "Suckerpunch" and "Turn the Lights Out" were previously released on Lunar Prelude.

Track listing

Personnel 
Delain
 Charlotte Wessels – lead vocals
 Martijn Westerholt – keyboards, backing vocals
 Timo Somers – lead guitar, backing vocals
 Merel Bechtold – rhythm guitar
 Otto Schimmelpenninck van der Oije – bass
 Ruben Israel – drums

Additional musicians
 Alissa White-Gluz – guest vocals on "Hands of Gold"
 Guus Eikens – additional guitars
 Hendrik Jan de Jong (Nemesea) – writing credits (3, 10)
 Oliver Philipps – additional guitars, additional keyboards
 Mikko P. Mustonen – orchestration

Production
 Martijn Westerholt – production, orchestration
 Arno Krabman – drum recording
 Bas Trumpie, Imre Beerends – mixing (10), drum recording
 Guido Aalbers, Oliver Philipps – vocal engineers
 Fredrik Nordström, Henrik Udd – mixing (1 to 9, 11)
 Ted Jensen – mastering at Sterling Sound, New York
 Glenn Arthur – cover artwork, additional paintings
 Wendy van den Bogert-Elberse – design
 Sandra Ludewig – photography

Charts

References

External links 
 Metallum Archives

Delain albums
2016 albums
Napalm Records albums